Rich Relations is a 1937 American comedy film directed by Clifford Sanforth and starring Ralph Forbes, Frances Grant, and Barry Norton. Written by Joseph O'Donnell and based on the novel of the same name by Priscilla Wayne, the film is about a secretary who is romanced by a "ladies' man" unaware that her boss is in love with her. The film was released in the United States on February 1, 1937.

Cast
 Ralph Forbes as Dave Walton
 Frances Grant as Nancy Tilton
 Barry Norton as Don Blair
 Muriel Evans as Trixie Lane
 Franklin Pangborn as Mr. Dwight
 Wesley Barry as Albert
 Jeanie Roberts as Buddy
 Crauford Kent as Mr. Colby
 Ethel Clayton as Mrs. Blair
 Donald Kirke
 Mary Carr
 Ed Lawrence
 Irving White
 Gertrude Astor
 Harry Myers
 Mary MacLaren
 Rosemary Theby

References

External links

 
 

1937 films
1937 comedy films
American black-and-white films
American comedy films
1930s English-language films
Films directed by Clifford Sanforth
1930s American films